Mandya to Mumbai, which was earlier named as Anekere Beedhi, is a 2016 Kannada-language film written and directed by Raajashekar produced by S. Jyothi Lingam under the banner Sree Neela Durga Parameshwari combines starring Rakesh Adiga and Amrutha Rao in the lead roles. Sanjjanaa is playing a main character in the film. The film is a remake of Tamil film Renigunta was directed by R. Panneerselvam, which had Johnny, Sanusha, Nishanth and Sanjana Singh in the important roles. The Plot revolves around young criminals and explores the reasons that instigate them to commit crime.

Plot 
The movie begins in Mandya where the Hero leads a happy life with his parents. A shocking incident changes his life. His parents are murdered by an anti-social and Hero is forced to go to prison, where he is tortured. He comes across four criminals in the prison. These hardcore criminals break loose from the prison and help Hero take revenge on his parents' killers. They decide to go to Mumbai where they plan to become big gangsters. But fate has other plans.

Cast
Rakesh Adiga
Naveen Krishna
Sadhu Kokila
Thilak Shekar
Sanjjanaa Galrani
Theepetti Ganesan
Amrutha Rao
Raajashekar
Chandan
Chirag
Achyuth Kumar
Kaddipudu Chandru
Mico Nagaraj
Petrol Prasanna
Kote Prabhakar

Soundtrack

Charan Raj, who earlier composed for Godhi Banna Sadharana Mykattu, has composed the film's soundtrack. The soundtrack album consists of 6 tracks.
 
Actor Sudeepa recorded two songs for the soundtrack including an item number "Deola Deola open the door". with Madhuri Itagi dancing for the song

Release 
The Times of India gave the film a rating of two-and-a-half out of five stars and wrote that "This film does have its moments that make you sit up and take notice, but you need to stock up some patience to keep yourself without fidgeting between those scenes. Watch this film if you like stories that deal with the underdogs and their valour".

References

External links
 

2016 films
Kannada remakes of Tamil films
2010s Kannada-language films